3,5-Dinitrobenzoyl chloride (C7H3ClN2O5) is an organic compound with a melting point of 68–69 °C. It is the acyl chloride of 3,5-dinitrobenzoic acid and like it is mainly used in the analysis of organic substances by derivatization.

Synthesis 
3,5-dinitrobenzoyl chloride is prepared by the reaction of 3,5-dinitrobenzoic acid with phosphorus pentachloride, PCl5. It can likewise be prepared by reaction with phosphorus trichloride, PCl3, or thionyl chloride, SOCl2.

Uses 
3,5-Dinitrobenzoyl chloride has its main use in the analysis of organic compounds by derivatization, specifically of alcohols and amines. It is used in cases where the substance to be analyzed is sensitive and cannot be directly reacted with 3,5-dinitrobenzoic acid. Generally, the reaction is done in pyridine in order to bind the hydrogen chloride released. With this method, it is for instance possible to identify amino acids.

References 

Acyl chlorides
Nitrobenzenes